Beilschmiedia robertsonii is an Asian tree species in the family Lauraceae.  Records of occurrence include Indo-China and in Vietnam it may be called săng gia; no subspecies are listed in the Catalogue of Life.

References 

Flora of Indo-China
Trees of Vietnam
robertsonii